These are the Billboard Hot Dance Club Play and Singles Sales number-one hits of 2009. The first number-one Dance Club Song of the year was "I Hate This Part" by American pop girl group The Pussycat Dolls, which spent two consecutive weeks atop the chart. Multiple artists made one chart appearance, including  The Killers with "Human", Donna Summer with "Fame (The Game)", LeAnn Rimes with "What I Cannot Change", Shontelle with "T-Shirt", and Lily Allen with "The Fear". American singer Mariah Carey garnered her fourteenth and fifteenth number-ones on the chart with "I Stay in Love" from her eleventh studio album E=MC² (2008) and with "Obsessed" from her twelfth studio album Memoirs of an Imperfect Angel (2009), respectively.

French DJ David Guetta topped the Dance Club chart two times with "Sexy Bitch", a collaboration with Akon, and with "When Love Takes Over", a collaboration with Kelly Rowland; "When Love Takes Over spent two consecutive weeks atop the chart, and ranked at number one on the 2009 Hot Dance Club Songs year end chart. The Pussycat Dolls and Kristine W both achieved three number one singles on the chart. In addition to "I Hate This Part", which peaked at number one for two consecutive weeks, The Pussycat Dolls also topped the chart with "Bottle Pop", a collaboration with Snoop Dogg, and "Hush Hush", featuring Nicole Scherzinger. Kristine W topped the chart with "Never", "Love Is the Look", and "Be Alright". Beyoncé and Lady Gaga were the only artists to achieve at least four number one songs on the chart. The former topped the chart with "Single Ladies (Put a Ring on It)", "Diva", "Halo", and "Sweet Dreams". The latter topped the chart with the songs "Poker Face", "LoveGame", "Paparazzi", and "Bad Romance".

See also 
List of number-one dance airplay hits of 2009 (U.S.)
2009 in music
List of number-one dance hits (United States)
List of artists who reached number one on the U.S. Dance chart
Artists with the most number-ones on the U.S. dance chart

References

External links 
Billboard Dance/Club Play Songs

2009
United States Dance Singles
Number-one dance singles